The Coachella Valley Invitational is a preseason exhibition tournament hosted by the LA Galaxy at the Empire Polo Club in Indio, California. The first edition of the tournament was held in February 2022 and featured clubs from Major League Soccer, MLS Next Pro, and the USL Championship.

Background 
The tournament was announced on January 18, 2022, by the LA Galaxy. The event is expected to be held behind closed doors.

Participants

2022 edition

Standings

Teams

Matches

2023 edition

Standings

References 

LA Galaxy
Soccer in California
American soccer friendly trophies
2022 establishments in California
Recurring sporting events established in 2022
Indio, California